Electrify Canada is a partnership formed by Electrify America in cooperation with Volkswagen Group Canada that is building electric vehicle (EV) direct current (DC) charging infrastructure throughout Canada.

Overview 
Electrify Canada's goal is to promote greater Zero-Emission Vehicle (ZEV) adoption by offering an ultra-fast and convenient charging network. Their goal is to fuel today's EVs, as well as the rapid growth in EV models expected from many car companies.

Charging 
Each site has an average of four chargers and use the non-proprietary DC fast charging technologies (CCS and CHAdeMO). Maximum charging power will range from 150kW to 350kW, capable of charging the expected longer range, larger battery vehicles that are coming to market and also capable of delivering 50kW charging power to support almost every model of EV on the road today.

Electrify Canada was established in July 2018, opened its first charging station in September 2019, and has 30 station locations open as of July 2022. Electrify Canada’s goal is to promote greater Zero-Emission Vehicle (ZEV) adoption by building a transformative, ultra-fast electric vehicle (EV) direct current (DC) charging infrastructure that gives Canadians the speed and reliability to confidently make the switch to electric. Electrify Canada aims to have more than 100 charging stations with over 500 chargers across
nine provinces by end of 2025.

Electrify Canada has developed an application that allows users to locate and access charging stations, in addition to the information being available via the company website..

Competing DC fast charge networks are run by Petro-Canada and Tesla.

In January 2023, Electrify Canada and  Electrify America announced that by 2026 the organisation aims to have 10,000 chargers and 1,800 charging stations across the USA and Canada combined.

See also 
Electrify America
Electric vehicle charging network
Charging station
IONITY

References

External links
 Electrify Canada
 Electrify America

Charging stations
Electric vehicle infrastructure developers
Volkswagen Group
2018 establishments in Ontario
Companies based in Ontario